Dylan Murray (born April 29, 1995 in New York City) is a professional squash player who represents the United States. He reached a career-high world ranking of World No. 369 in February 2012.

References

External links 
 
 

American male squash players
Living people
1995 births